The 2018 Arkansas Razorbacks football team represented the University of Arkansas in the 2018 NCAA Division I FBS football season. The Razorbacks played their home games at Donald W. Reynolds Razorback Stadium in Fayetteville, Arkansas, with one home game at War Memorial Stadium in Little Rock. Arkansas played as a member of the Western Division of the Southeastern Conference (SEC). The Razorbacks were led by first-year head coach Chad Morris. They finished the season 2–10, 0–8 in SEC play to finish in last place in the Western Division.

Previous season

The Razorbacks finished the 2017 season 4–8, 1–7 in SEC play to finish in last place in the Western Division.

Preseason

Position key

Recruits
The Razorbacks signed a total of 17 recruits.

Preseason headlines 
June 6, 2018: It was announced that former Arkansas tight end Will Gragg had transferred to Pittsburgh, with two years of immediate eligibility remaining.
June 8, 2018: Arkansas wide receiver Kofi Boateng announced his retirement from football following two knee injuries.
July 10, 2018: The Arkansas athletic department released the design of the 2018 uniform, which featured small tweaks from the past few years. These changes included the elimination of matte-finish helmets in favor of a glossier "pearl cardinal" finish, removal of details on the jersey to "de-clutter" the chest area, and a new stripe design on the pants.
July 20, 2018: The SEC media poll was released, and placed the Razorbacks last out of the seven teams in the SEC West. The Hogs received 412 votes, 166 shy of sixth-place Ole Miss.
July 21, 2018: The Razorbacks had three players selected to the preseason all-SEC teams. The second-team offense featured OL Hjalte Froholdt, and the third-team defense featured LB De'Jon Harris and DB Santos Ramirez.

Award watch lists
Listed in the order that they were released

Spring game
The 2018 Arkansas Red–White Spring Football Game took place at War Memorial Stadium in Little Rock, with kickoff at 1:00 p.m. CT on April 7. It was broadcast on the SEC Network. The white team consisted of the offense and the red team consisted of the defense.

The spring game followed a different format: the game was played in twelve minute quarters, rather than fifteen, with a running clock in the second half. The game was scored traditionally on offense (white team), but the defense (red team) could earn points for a variety of achievements (6 pts. for touchdown, 3 for turnover or 4th down stop, 2 for three-and-out, 2 for blocked kick, 1 for sack or TFL).

Schedule
The Razorbacks' 2018 schedule consisted of 7 home games, 4 away games, and 1 neutral game in the regular season. The Razorbacks hosted SEC foes Alabama, Ole Miss (in Little Rock), Vanderbilt, and LSU, and traveled to Auburn, Mississippi State, and Missouri. Arkansas played against Texas A&M in Arlington, Texas for the fifth year in a row.

Arkansas hosted three of its four of its non–conference games: against Eastern Illinois from the Ohio Valley Conference, North Texas from Conference USA, and Tulsa from the American Athletic Conference. The lone away non–conference game saw the Hogs travel to Fort Collins, Colorado to play Colorado State, from the Mountain West Conference.

Per southernpigskin.com, the Razorbacks' schedule ranked as the 39th-toughest of the 66 Power Five teams in the nation.

Schedule source

Personnel

Coaching staff

Coaching changes
Chad Morris, former head coach at Southern Methodist University, was hired on December 6, 2017, to be the 33rd head coach of the Arkansas Razorbacks, following the dismissal of Bret Bielema just under two weeks prior. On January 9, 2018, Joe Craddock was named offensive coordinator, and John Chavis was named defensive coordinator. Both had previously served the same roles at SMU and Texas A&M, respectively.

Barry Lunney Jr., the tight ends coach, and John Scott Jr., a defensive line coach, were the only two assistants retained, and will enter their sixth and second seasons, respectively, in their current positions with the Razorbacks.

Roster

Team captains
Prior to the season, Coach Chad Morris announced that permanent captains would not be announced until later in the season, and the captain spots would rotate until then.

Week 1 vs. EIU: #51 Hjalte Froholdt (senior OL), #1 Jared Cornelius (senior WR), #9 Santos Ramirez (senior DB), #8 De'Jon Harris (junior LB), #23 Dre Greenlaw (senior LB)
Week 2 vs. CSU: #91 Michael Taylor II (senior DL), #90 Armon Watts (senior DL), #60 Brian Wallace (senior OL), #18 Jeremy Patton (senior TE)
Week 3 vs. NT: #7 Jonathan Nance (senior WR), #3 McTelvin Agim (junior DL), #73 Deion Malone (senior DL), #13 Nate Dalton (junior DB)
Week 4 vs. AUB: #10 Randy Ramsey (senior DL), #1 Jared Cornelius (senior WR), #51 Hjalte Froholdt (senior OL), #9 Santos Ramirez (senior DB)

Prior to the Week 5 game against Texas A&M, permanent captains were announced.

Permanent season captains: #51 Hjalte Froholdt (senior OL), #8 De'Jon Harris (junior LB), #9 Santos Ramirez (senior DB), #23 Dre Greenlaw (senior LB)

Game summaries

Eastern Illinois

Coach Morris named Hjalte Froholdt, Jared Cornelius, Santos Ramirez, De'Jon Harris, and Dre Greenlaw team captains for Arkansas' first game. Cole Kelley was named the starting quarterback, though Ty Storey played the majority of the game, throwing three touchdown passes. With the victory, Arkansas improved to 98–23–4 all-time in season openers, with Chad Morris becoming the eighth consecutive Razorback head coach to win their first game at Arkansas. This game also gave Arkansas a 6–0 record against current OVC members, their last win coming in 2015 against UT Martin.

at Colorado State

Coach Morris named Michael Taylor II, Armon Watts, Brian Wallace, and Jeremy Patton as the captains for Arkansas' second game. The pregame depth charts named both Cole Kelley and Ty Storey as starting quarterbacks, though Storey started the game and played the entire first half. However, he was replaced by Kelley for the second half after throwing two interceptions. The loss dropped the Razorbacks to 14–2 against current MWC opponents, with the last contest, in 2011, resulting in an Arkansas win over New Mexico.

North Texas

For Arkansas' third game, Coach Morris named Jonathan Nance, McTelvin Agim, Deion Malone, and Nate Dalton as captains. For the second straight game, the pregame depth chart listed both Kelley and Storey as starting quarterbacks; Kelley ultimately got the start and played into the third quarter before being replaced by freshman Connor Noland, who shared the remaining drives with freshman John Stephen Jones. The loss dropped Arkansas to 54–30 against current C–USA opponents, 10–1 since joining the SEC.

at No. 9 Auburn

Coach Morris named Randy Ramsey, Jared Cornelius, Hjalte Froholdt, and Santos Ramirez to be captains for Arkansas' fourth game. For the first time this season, Ty Storey was named the sole starting quarterback; he played the entire game, save for a few snaps given to Kelley.

vs. Texas A&M

Prior to Arkansas' fifth game, Chad Morris named the permanent captains for the remainder of the season: Santos Ramirez, Hjalte Froholdt, Dre Greenlaw, and De'Jon Harris. For the second game in a row, Ty Storey was named the starting quarterback.

No. 1 Alabama

For the third consecutive game, pregame depth charts listed Ty Storey as Arkansas' starting quarterback. This was Arkansas' 24th matchup against an AP No. 1 team; the loss dropped them to 4–20. Additionally, Cheyenne O'Grady became only the 3rd SEC player to score two receiving touchdowns in one half against a Nick Saban–led Alabama team.

Ole Miss

This game was the first since 2014 that Arkansas faced an SEC opponent in Little Rock.

Tulsa

For the fourth time in the last five years, the Razorbacks faced a non–P5 opponent for their homecoming game. After Ty Storey was injured against Ole Miss, freshman Connor Noland was named the starter. Noland played into the third quarter until he was injured on a hit and momentarily replaced by Cole Kelley. He and Kelley shared the remainder of the snaps in the game.

Vanderbilt

No. 9 LSU

at No. 25 Mississippi State

at Missouri

Statistics

Scores by quarter

Rankings

Preseason polls

Players drafted into the NFL

References

Arkansas
Arkansas Razorbacks football seasons
Arkansas Razorbacks football